The qiran (also Romanized kran) was a currency of Iran between 1825 and 1932. It was subdivided into 20 shahi or 1000 dinar and was worth one tenth of a toman. The rial replaced the kran at par in 1932, although it was divided into one hundred (new) dinars. The kran is no longer an official denomination but the term still enjoys wide usage among Iranians.

Value
From 1874 to 1895, the value of the kran depreciated by half relative to sterling, from 1 qiran equal to 9.6d. to 4.8d. (50 krans for £1 stg), which then kept that value for the next few years.

In 1930, it was pegged to sterling at 59.75 krans = £1 stg, although a regulated parallel market existed where the price of sterling is much higher than the aforementioned legal rate.

Coins
Until 1876, silver coins were minted in denominations of ⅛, ¼, ½ and 1 qiran. A milled coinage was introduced in 1876, with denominations of 12, 25, 50, 100 and 200 dinar, ¼, ½, 1, 2 and 5 qiran. Gold coins and banknotes were denominated in toman.

References

External links

 Iran Collection, a website about Persian banknotes and coins since Qajar era.

Currencies of Iran
Modern obsolete currencies
Economic history of Iran
1825 establishments in Iran
1932 disestablishments